This is a follow list of the north-south arterial thoroughfares in the Canadian City Guelph. Some of these date back to the late 1800s. Most of the streets will follow the north-south pattern except for Eramosa Road. This list will order the roads in west-east order.

Whitelaw Road 

Whitelaw Road is a road near the border of Guelph (west). Its true south end is near Niska Road and Sideroad 10 N. Its arrival to Guelph is near Wellington Rd 124 (Wellington Street West) after the industrial area. After Fife Road, the street becomes a residential area to Paisley Road, where the road ends.

Elmira Road

Elmira Road starts at a dead end near Fife Road. Then it moves diagonally left near Rochelle Dr.  Elmira Road rapidly changes into 50 km/h after Paisley Road and continuing to Woodlawn. Once it reaches to Woodlawn Road West, the speed changes into 80 km/h. Elmira Road haven't really ended until Wilbert Street, but some say it is already in Wellington Road 86 already, so it doesn't count. The WR 86 goes to Waterloo Region and changes into Church Street.

Imperial Road

Imperial Road is a secondary road in the city of Guelph. It is close to Hwy 6 (not between Stephanie Drive and Kipling Ave) and mostly commercial. It has places like West End Community Centre, Majestic Collison (near Curtis Drive) and Cineplex Guelph. It is one of the arterial roads in Guelph that doesn't cross the Guelph border.

Downey Road

Downey Road is a road in Guelph that passes through West Puslinch and is 3 km above Imperial Road. Downey Road leads to the YMCA and the future line that connects Stone Road up north for the future interchange of Highway 6.

Westwood Road

Westwood Road is a road that passes through Highway 6 with an overpass. It begins at the major road of Silvercreek Parkway North and continues west until Willow Road, which starts building up north to Imperial Road N. and ends near Bond Crt.

Hanlon Expressway

Hanlon Expressway or Hanlon Parkway is a soon-to-become freeway in the city of Guelph. It consists Highway 6 (mainly) and Highway 7 at the Wellington Street interchange and beyond. Hanlon Expressway was supposed to go up to College Avenue, but the constructions in 1950s and 1960s brought up to this 15 km high road. It started up into a trumpet interchange in Hwy 401 and arrived at Guelph near Maltby Road. Laird Road was the first interchange to come across Hwy. 6. To see more information, go to the highlighted link above.

Silvercreek Parkway

Silvercreek Parkway is a major road aligned to Hanlon Expressway on the east. The road was split on the south side and the north side. The first part of Silvercreek was near Waterloo Avenue at the interchange of Wellington Street W. It was around 900 m. The second part of Silvercreek was the major portion. At the reach of Curtis Drive, WR 39 continues until WR 51.

Janefield Avenue

Janefield Avenue is a road nearby the Stone Road Mall at the south end and Centennial at the north.

Scottsdale Drive

Scottsdale Drive is a road aligned at the Stone Road Mall near Stone Road. It is also a replacement of Silvercreek Parkway South.

Alma Street

Alma Street is a road intersecting major roads near the Downtown Area. The street splits at Inkerman Street (near Paisley Road).

Guelph
Transport in Guelph